The 2009 FIM Motocross World Championship was the 53rd F.I.M. Motocross Racing World Championship season. Antonio Cairoli won the MX1 title for Yamaha, Marvin Musquin claimed the MX2 title for KTM and Pierre Renet triumphed in MX3 for Honda.

Overview 
The 2009 season started on 29 March in Faenza, Italy and finished on 13 September in Canelinha, Brazil. The fifteen races of the season were held in fourteen countries, Italy, Bulgaria, Turkey, Nederlands (2x), Portugal, Spain, Great Britain, France, Germany, Latvia, Sweden, Belgium, Czech Republic and Brazil.

Grands Prix

Standings

Scoring system

Points are awarded to the top twenty finishers.

Riders' standings

MX1

MX2

MX3

Manufacturers' standings

MX1 manufacturers standings

Participants 
All entries taken from the official MX Motocross site.

MX1 and MX2 participants

References

External links
 

FIM Motocross World Championship season
2009